Burpo is a surname. Notable people with the surname include:

 C. W. Burpo (1904–1982), American radio evangelist
 George Burpo (1922–2015), American baseball player
 Preston Burpo (born 1972), American soccer player and coach
 Todd Burpo (born 1968), American author and pastor, wrote Heaven Is For Real